Janolus is a genus of small to large sea slugs, or more accurately nudibranchs, marine gastropod mollusks, in the family Janolidae. The name Janolus is derived from the two-headed god Janus, in ancient Roman mythology.

Description
Adult individuals of Janolus species can be between 2.5 cm to 8 cm long, depending on the species. They are semi-translucent and the body is covered in short cerata.

Distribution
Janolus species are found in many areas world-wide, including Europe, Australia, Japan and Africa.

Ecology

Habitat 
This genus of nudibranch is found in shallow and subtidal waters.

Feeding habits 
Janolus species feed on Bryozoa, moss animals.

Predators 
In California, Navanax is a known predator of Janolus. Navanax tracks the slime of Janolus by using chemoreceptors. When Janolus is about to be caught, it rolls into a ball, leaving its cerata exposed.

Species
Species in the genus Janolus include:
 Janolus anulatus Camacho-Garcia & Gosliner, 2006
 Janolus australis Bergh, 1884
 Janolus chilensis M.A. Fischer, Cervera & Ortea, 1997
 Janolus comis Er. Marcus, 1955
 Janolus eximius Miller & Willan, 1986
 Janolus faustoi Ortea & Llera, 1988
 Janolus flavoanulatus Pola & Gosliner, 2019
 Janolus hyalinus (Alder and Hancock, 1854)
 Janolus ignis Miller & Willan, 1986
 Janolus incrustans Pola & Gosliner, 2019
 Janolus kinoi Edmunds & Carmona, 2017
 Janolus mirabilis Baba & Abe, 1970
 Janolus mokohinau Miller & Willan, 1986
 Janolus mucloc (Er. Marcus, 1958)
 Janolus rebeccae Schrödl, 1996
 Janolus savinkini Martynov & Korshunova, 2012
 Janolus toyamensis Baba & Abe, 1970
 Janolus tricellariodes Pola & Gosliner, 2019
Species brought into synonymy
 Janolus barbarensis (J. G. Cooper, 1863):synonym of Antiopella barbarensis (J. G. Cooper, 1863)
 Janolus capensis Bergh, 1907:synonym of Antiopella capensis (Bergh, 1907) (original combination)
 Janolus costacubensis Ortea & Espinosa, 2000:synonym of Janolus comis Er. Marcus, 1955
 Janolus cristatus (Delle Chiaje, 1841):synonym of Antiopella cristata (Delle Chiaje, 1841)
 Janolus flagellatus Eliot, 1906:synonym of Janolus hyalinus (Alder & Hancock, 1854) (dubious synonym)
 Janolus fuscus O'Donoghue, 1924:synonym of Antiopella fusca (O'Donoghue, 1924) (original combination)
 Janolus longidentatus Gosliner, 1981:synonym of Antiopella longidentata (Gosliner, 1981) (original combination)
 Janolus nakaza (Gosliner, 1981):synonym of Bonisa nakaza Gosliner, 1981
 Janolus novozealandicus (Eliot, 1907):synonym of Antiopella novozealandica Eliot, 1907
 Janolus praeclarus (Bouchet, 1975):synonym of Antiopella praeclara Bouchet, 1975

References

Proctonotidae